Kristen Butler (born May 13, 1984) is an American, former four-time professional All-Star softball catcher and current head coach for Rutgers. She played college softball for Florida in the Southeastern Conference from 2003 to 2006 and won the SEC Player of the Year award in 2006. She later went undrafted but played in the National Pro Fastpitch from 2006 to 2009, 12 for the Akron Racers and Chicago Bandits; currently Butler ranks top-10 in career RBIs and home runs for the league.

Coaching career

Toledo
On July 8, 2014, Kristen Butler was announced as the new head coach of the Toledo softball program.

Rutgers
On June 8, 2018, Kristen Butler was announced as the new head coach of the Rutgers softball program.

Statistics

Florida Gators

Head Coaching Record

College

References

External links
 
 

Living people
Softball players from Florida
Female sports coaches
American softball coaches
Florida Gators softball players
Florida Gators softball coaches
Mississippi Valley State Devilettes softball coaches
Charleston Southern Buccaneers softball coaches
Toledo Rockets softball coaches
Rutgers Scarlet Knights softball coaches
1984 births
Akron Racers players